Cha Ji-ho (born 23 March 1983 in Seoul) is a retired South Korean football player.

Cha mostly played for Roasso Kumamoto.

Club statistics

References

External links 

Living people
1983 births
Association football midfielders
South Korean footballers
South Korean expatriate footballers
Lyn Fotball players
Kongsvinger IL Toppfotball players
Busan IPark players
Melbourne Knights FC players
Roasso Kumamoto players
Pohang Steelers players
Eliteserien players
Norwegian First Division players
K League 1 players
Victorian Premier League players
J2 League players
Expatriate footballers in Norway
Expatriate soccer players in Australia
Expatriate footballers in Japan
South Korean expatriate sportspeople in Norway
South Korean expatriate sportspeople in Australia
South Korean expatriate sportspeople in Japan
Footballers from Seoul